Louis-Félix Rhénasteine (1718–1799) was a painter from what is now Belgium. He was born in Malmedy, Prince-Bishopric of Liège, where he also died. He was notable for his religious works and portraits. He is also known as Louy Phélix Rhénasteine in writings of the period.

Life
A son of the painter Nicolas Rhénasteine, he worked for the courts of the Princely Abbey of Stavelot-Malmedy and of the Prince-Bishopric of Liège. He had three sons, who all also became portraitists:
Nicolas Joseph Rhénasteine or Renasteie (1750-1830) 
Louis Joseph Félix Rhénasteine (1754-1795), painter of the portrait of prince-bishop François-Charles de Velbrück now in the Curtius Museum in Liège *Englebert Rhénasteine (1758-1831).

Paintings

Portraits
 Portrait of Charles-Nicolas d'Oultremont, prince-bishop of Liège, c.1763 : Liège, Palais provincial.
 Portrait of François-Charles de Velbrück, prince-bishop of Liège, 1782 : Liège, Curtius Museum.
 Portrait of Nicolas Massin, prince-abbot of Stavelot-Malmedy: Malmedy Cathedral
 Portrait of Joseph de Nollet, prince-abbot of Stavelot-Malmedy, 1757 : Malmedy Cathedral
 Portrait of Jacques-Maximilien-Joseph de Rubin, prince-abbot of Stavelot-Malmedy, c. 1770: Malmedy Cathedral
 Portrait Francis I of Lorraine, oil on canvas, 1757 : Treasury of Malmedy Cathedral

Religious works
 Resurrection of Christ : Bellevaux, église Saint-Aubin.
 Isidore of Seville, c.1730 : Bévercé, chapelle Saint-Antoine Ermite.
 The Dead Christ in a Shroud with the Virgin and St John, 1755 : Malmedy, chapelle Saint-François.
 Resurrection of Christ, c.1755 : Malmedy, chapelle de la Résurrection.
 Holy Family, c. 1745 : Robertville, high altarpiece of the église saint-Joseph.

Manuscripts and drawings 
 Arcus triumphalis reverendissimo ... D. Nicolao de Massin ... abbati Stabulen. & Malmundarien., manuscript book of painted emblems, dedicated to Nicolas Massin : Cambridge (Massachusetts), Houghton Library, Harvard University, cote Ms. lat. 419.
 Frontispiece to the psalter for the Benedictine monastery at Malmedy, manuscript, 1745-1755 : Treasury of Malmedy Cathedral.
 Report on the coats of arms of Stavelot Abbey, series of 7 drawings: Liège, Archives de l'État.

References

Bibliography
  Jean-Jacques Bolly, Province de Liège. Canton de Malmedy, Bruxelles, 1978, 70 p.
  Jean Philippe George, « Le Trésor de la Cathédrale de Malmedy », Bloc-Notes. Trésor de la cathédrale de Liège, vol. 3, no 5, 2005, p. 4-9 (lire en ligne [archive])
  Jean Julien Maquet, « Le portrait de Monseigneur de Grady († 1767), une œuvre inédite de Louis-Félix Rhénasteine ? », Chroniques d’archéologie et d’histoire du pays de Liège, vol. 2, no 11, juillet-septembre 2005, p. 114-117 (lire en ligne [archive]).
  Paul-André de Fossa, « Portrait du « chevalier » Alexandre de Franquinet (1711–1788), par Louis-Félix Rhénasteine », Le Parchemin, vol. 417, mai-juin 2015, p. 245–249.

External links
  Dictionnaire des peintres belges (IRPA)

Belgian portrait painters
18th-century painters from the Prince-Bishopric of Liège
People from Malmedy
1718 births
1799 deaths